Brazil has more than 1900 bird species, and according to the Chico Mendes Institute for Biodiversity Conservation and the Brazilian Ministry of the Environment, there are 240 species or subspecies of Brazilian birds listed as threatened, six as extinct and two as extinct in the wild. The Brazilian definition uses the same criteria and categories of IUCN. Among the 33 orders of birds in Brazil, 22 have threatened species. The passerine order (songbirds), besides being the most diverse order in Brazil, also has the most species on the Brazilian Red List, followed by parrots. The Northeast Region, notably the Atlantic forest and Caatinga, has the most endemic and threatened birds, and two of them, the Alagoas curassow and the Spix's macaw, are considered to be extinct in the wild. The Pernambuco Endemism Center presents many critically endangered species due to the intense destruction of the Atlantic forest. Some species might be extinct in Brazil, like the glaucous macaw and the Eskimo curlew.

A list of threatened species was published by Diário Oficial da União, on December 17, 2014. Even though some species have been removed from the list (for instance, the hyacinth macaw), the number of threatened species has increased in comparison with the former list (which had 160 taxa). Furthermore, the number of known species has been increasing considerably since the last half of the 20th century, and this has influenced the number of listed species.

In spite of using the same criteria, the ICMBio list often shows a different conservation status than the IUCN. That is because the assessments were done at different times by different researchers.

Threatened birds of Brazil - ICMBio (2014)

Order Tinamiformes (tinamous)

Family Tinamidae
 Crypturellus noctivagus noctivagus (yellow-legged tinamou)  - ICMBio status 
 Crypturellus noctivagus zabele (yellow-legged tinamou)  - ICMBio status 
 Nothura minor (lesser nothura)  - ICMBio status 
 Taoniscus nanus (dwarf tinamou)  - ICMBio status 
 Tinamus tao (grey tinamou)  - ICMBio status

Order Anseriformes (ducks, geese, and swans)

Family Anatidae
 Mergus octosetaceus (Brazilian merganser)  - ICMBio status

Order Galliformes (gamebirds, landfowl, gallinaceous birds)

Family Cracidae (chachalacas, guans and curassows)
 Aburria jacutinga (black-fronted piping guan)  - ICMBio status 
 Crax blumenbachii (red-billed curassow)  - ICMBio status 
 Crax globulosa (wattled curassow)  - ICMBio status 
 Crax fasciolata pinima (Natterer's curassow)  - ICMBio status 
 Pauxi mitu (Alagoas curassow)  - ICMBio status 
 Penelope jacucaca (white-browed guan)  - ICMBio status 
 Penelope ochrogaster (chestnut-bellied guan)  - ICMBio status 
 Penelope pileata (white-crested guan)  - ICMBio status 
 Penelope superciliaris alagoensis (rusty-margined guan)  - ICMBio status 
 Ortalis guttata remota (speckled chachalaca)  - ICMBio status 

Family Odontophoridae (New World quails)
 Odontophorus capueira plumbeicollis (spot-winged wood quail)  - ICMBio status

Ordem Procellariiformes (petrels)

Family Diomedeidae (albatrosses)
 Diomedea dabbenena (Tristan albatross)  - ICMBio status 
 Diomedea epomophora (southern royal albatross)  - ICMBio status 
 Diomedea exulans (wandering albatross)  - ICMBio status 
 Diomedea sanfordi (northern royal albatross)  - ICMBio status 
 Thalassarche chlororhynchos (Atlantic yellow-nosed albatross)  - ICMBio status 

Família Procellariidae (petrels)
 Procellaria aequinoctialis (white-chinned petrel)  - ICMBio status 
 Procellaria conspicillata (spectacled petrel)  - Estado ICMBio 
 Pterodroma arminjoniana (Trindade petrel)  - ICMBio status 
 Pterodroma deserta (Desertas petrel)  - ICMBio status 
 Pterodroma incerta (Atlantic petrel)  - ICMBio status 
 Pterodroma madeira (Zino's petrel)  - ICMBio status 
 Puffinus lherminieri (Audubon's shearwater)  - ICMBio status

Order Phaethontiformes (tropicbirds)

Family Phaethontidae
 Phaethon aethereus (red-billed tropicbird)  - ICMBio status 
 Phaethon lepturus (white-tailed tropicbird)  - ICMBio status

Order Suliformes

Family Sulidae (boobies)
 Sula sula (red-footed booby)  - ICMBio status

Order Pelecaniformes

Family Ardeidae (herons)
 Tigrisoma fasciatum (fasciated tiger heron)  - ICMBio status

Ordem Accipitriformes (hawks, eagles and vultures)

Family Accipitridae
 Amadonastur lacernulatus (white-necked hawk)  - ICMBio status 
 Circus cinereus (cinereous harrier)  - ICMBio status 
 Harpia harpyja (harpy eagle)  - ICMBio status 
 Leptodon forbesi (white-collared kite)  - ICMBio status 
 Morphnus guianensis (crested eagle)  - ICMBio status 
 Urubutinga coronata (crowned solitary eagle)  - ICMBio status

Order Gruiformes (cranes)

Family Psophiidae (trumpeters)
 Psophia dextralis (dark-winged trumpeter)  - ICMBio status 
 Psophia interjecta (dark-winged trumpeter)  - ICMBio status 
 Psophia obscura (dark-winged trumpeter)  - ICMBio status 

Family Rallidae (rails)
 Porzana spiloptera (dot-winged crake)  - ICMBio status

Order Charadriiformes (waders, gulls and auks)

Family Charadriidae (plovers, dotterels, and lapwings)
 Charadrius wilsonia (Wilson's plover)  - ICMBio status 

Family Scolopacidae (sandpipers)
 Calidris canutus (red knot)  - ICMBio status 
 Calidris pusilla (semipalmated sandpiper)  - ICMBio status 
 Calidris subruficollis (buff-breasted sandpiper)  - ICMBio status 
 Limnodromus griseus (short-billed dowitcher)  - ICMBio status 
 Numenius borealis (Eskimo curlew)  - ICMBio status 

Family Sternidae (terns)
 Sterna dougallii (roseate tern)  - ICMBio status 
 Sterna hirundinacea (South American tern)  - ICMBio status 
 Thalasseus maximus (royal tern)  - Estado ICMBio

Order Columbiformes (pigeons and doves)

Family Columbidae
 Claravis geoffroyi (purple-winged ground dove)  - ICMBio status (PEx)
 Columbina cyanopis (blue-eyed ground dove)  - ICMBio status (PEx)

Order Cuculiformes (cuckoos)

Family Cuculidae
 Neomorphus geoffroyi (rufous-vented ground cuckoo)  - ICMBio status 
 Neomorphus geoffroyi amazonicus (rufous-vented ground cuckoo)  - ICMBio status 
 Neomorphus geoffroyi dulcis (rufous-vented ground cuckoo)  - ICMBio status 
 Neomorphus geoffroyi geoffroyi (rufous-vented ground cuckoo)  - ICMBio status (PEx)
 Neomorphus squamiger (scaled ground cuckoo)  - Estado ICMBio

Ordem Strigiformes (owls)

Family Strigidae
 Glaucidium mooreorum (Pernambuco pygmy owl)  - ICMBio status 
 Pulsatrix perspicillata pulsatrix (spectacled owl)  - ICMBio status 
 Strix huhula albomarginata (black-banded owl)  - ICMBio status

Order Nyctibiiformes (potoos)

Family Nyctibiidae
 Nyctibius aethereus aethereus (long-tailed potoo)  - ICMBio status 
 Nyctibius leucopterus (white-winged potoo)  - ICMBio status

Ordem Caprimulgiformes (nightjars)

Family Caprimulgidae
 Hydropsalis candicans (white-winged nightjar)  - ICMBio status

Order Apodiformes (hummingbirds and swifts)

Family Trochilidae (hummingbirds)
 Augastes lumachella (hooded visorbearer)  - ICMBio status 
 Discosura langsdorffi langsdorffi (black-bellied thorntail)  - ICMBio status 
 Glaucis dohrnii (hook-billed hermit)  - ICMBio status 
 Lophornis gouldii (dot-eared coquette)  - ICMBio status 
 Phaethornis aethopygus (Tapajós hermit)  - Estado ICMBio 
 Phaethornis bourcieri major (straight-billed hermit)  - ICMBio status 
 Phaethornis margarettae (great-billed hermit)  - ICMBio status 
 Phaethornis margarettae camargoi (great-billed hermit)  - ICMBio status 
 Thalurania watertonii (long-tailed woodnymph)  - ICMBio status

Order Trogoniformes (trogons)

Family Trogonidae
 Trogon collaris eytoni (collared trogon)  - ICMBio status

Order Coraciiformes (kingfishers, bee-eaters, rollers and motmots)

Family Momotidae (motmots)
 Momotus momota marcgraviana (blue-crowned motmot)  - ICMBio status

Ordem Galbuliformes (puffbirds)

Family Bucconidae
 Monasa morphoeus morphoeus (white-fronted nunbird)  - ICMBio status

Order Piciformes (woodpeckers and toucans)

Family Capitonidae (American barbets)
 Capito dayi (black-girdled barbet)  - ICMBio status 

Family Ramphastidae (toucans)
 Pteroglossus bitorquatus bitorquatus (red-necked aracari)  - ICMBio status 
 Selenidera gouldii baturitensis (Gould's toucanet)  - ICMBio status 

Family Picidae (woodpeckers)
 Celeus flavus subflavus (cream-colored woodpecker)  - ICMBio status 
 Celeus obrieni (Kaempfer's woodpecker)  - ICMBio status 
 Celeus torquatus pieteroyensi (ringed woodpecker)  - ICMBio status 
 Celeus torquatus tinnunculus (Atlantic black-breasted woodpecker)  - ICMBio status 
 Dryocopus galeatus (helmeted woodpecker)  - ICMBio status 
 Piculus polyzonus  - ICMBio status 
 Piculus paraensis  - ICMBio status 
 Picumnus varzeae (Varzea piculet)  - ICMBio status

Order Psittaciformes (parrots, macaws, parakeets)

Family Psittacidae
 Amazona pretrei (red-spectacled amazon)  - ICMBio status 
 Amazona rhodocorytha (red-browed amazon)  - ICMBio status 
 Amazona vinacea (vinaceous-breasted amazon)  - ICMBio status 
 Anodorhynchus leari (Lear's macaw)  - ICMBio status 
 Anodorhynchus glaucus (glaucous macaw)  - ICMBio status 
 Aratinga solstitialis (sun parakeet)  - ICMBio status 
 Cyanopsitta spixii (Spix's macaw)  - ICMBio status (PExW)
 Guaruba guarouba (golden parakeet)  - ICMBio status 
 Pionus reichenowi (Reichenow's blue-headed parrot)  - ICMBio status 
 Pyrilia vulturina (vulturine parrot)  - ICMBio status 
 Pyrrhura cruentata (ochre-marked parakeet)  - ICMBio status 
 Pyrrhura lepida (pearly parakeet)  - ICMBio status 
 Pyrrhura lepida lepida (pearly parakeet)  - ICMBio status 
 Pyrrhura griseipectus (grey-breasted parakeet)  - ICMBio status 
 Pyrrhura leucotis (white-eared parakeet)  - ICMBio status 
 Pyrrhura pfrimeri (Pfrimer's parakeet)  - ICMBio status 
 Touit melanonotus (brown-backed parrotlet)  - ICMBio status 
 Touit surdus (golden-tailed parrotlet)  - ICMBio status

Order Passeriformes (songbirds)

Family Thamnophilidae (antbirds)
 Cercomacra ferdinandi (bananal antbird)  - ICMBio status 
 Dysithamnus plumbeus (plumbeous antvireo)  - ICMBio status 
 Formicivora erythronotos (black-hooded antwren)  - ICMBio status 
 Formicivora grantsaui (Sincorá antwren)  - ICMBio status 
 Formicivora littoralis (Restinga antwren)  - ICMBio status 
 Formicivora paludicola (São Paulo marsh antwren)  - ICMBio status 
 Herpsilochmus pileatus (Bahia antwren)  - ICMBio status 
 Hypocnemis ochrogyna (Rondonia warbling antbird)  - ICMBio status 
 Myrmoderus ruficaudus  - ICMBio status 
 Myrmotherula fluminensis (Rio de Janeiro antwren)  - ICMBio status (PEx)
 Myrmotherula klagesi (Klages's antwren)  - ICMBio status 
 Myrmotherula minor (Salvadori's antwren)  - ICMBio status 
 Myrmotherula snowi (Alagoas antwren)  - ICMBio status 
 Myrmotherula urosticta (band-tailed antwren)  - ICMBio status 
 Phlegopsis nigromaculata confinis (black-spotted bare-eye)  - ICMBio status 
 Phlegopsis nigromaculata paraensis (black-spotted bare-eye)  - ICMBio status 
 Pyriglena pernambucensis (Pernambuco fire-eye)  - ICMBio status 
 Pyriglena atra (fringe-backed fire-eye)  - ICMBio status 
 Rhegmatorhina gymnops (bare-eyed antbird)  - ICMBio status 
 Rhopornis ardesiacus (slender antbird)  - ICMBio status 
 Stymphalornis acutirostris (marsh antwren)  - ICMBio status 
 Terenura sicki (orange-bellied antwren)  - ICMBio status 
 Thamnomanes caesius caesius (cinereous antshrike)  - ICMBio status 
 Thamnophilus aethiops (white-shouldered antshrike)  - ICMBio status 
 Thamnophilus caerulescens cearensis (variable antshrike)  - ICMBio status 
 Thamnophilus caerulescens pernambucensis (variable antshrike)  - ICMBio status 
 Thamnophilus nigrocinereus (blackish-grey antshrike)  - ICMBio status 

Family Conopophagidae (gnateaters)
 Conopophaga lineata cearae (rufous gnateater)  - ICMBio status 
 Conopophaga lineata lineata (rufous gnateater)  - ICMBio status 
 Conopophaga melanops nigrifrons (black-cheeked gnateater)  - ICMBio status 

Family Grallariidae (antpittas)
 Grallaria varia distincta (variegated antpitta)  - ICMBio status 
 Grallaria varia intercedens (variegated antpitta)  - ICMBio status 
 Hylopezus paraensis (Snethlage's antpitta)  - ICMBio status 

Family Rhinocryptidae (tapaculos)
 Eleoscytalopus psychopompus (Bahia tapaculo)  - ICMBio status 
 Merulaxis stresemanni (Stresemann's bristlefront)  - ICMBio status 
 Scytalopus diamantinensis (Diamantina tapaculo)  - ICMBio status 
 Scytalopus gonzagai (Bahian mouse-colored tapaculo)  - ICMBio status 
 Scytalopus iraiensis (marsh tapaculo)  - ICMBio status 
 Scytalopus novacapitalis (Brasília tapaculo)  - ICMBio status 

Family Formicariidae (ground antbirds)
 Chamaeza nobilis (striated antthrush)  - ICMBio status 

Family Scleruridae (miners and leaftossers)
 Geositta poeciloptera (campo miner)  - ICMBio status 
 Sclerurus macconnelli bahiae (tawny-throated leaftosser)  - ICMBio status 
 Sclerurus caudacutus caligineus (black-tailed leaftosser)  - ICMBio status 
 Sclerurus caudacutus umbretta (black-tailed leaftosser)  - ICMBio status 

Family Dendrocolaptidae (woodcreepers)
 Campylorhamphus cardosoi (Tapajós scythebill)  - ICMBio status 
 Campylorhamphus multostriatus (Xingu curve-billed scythebill)  - ICMBio status 
 Campylorhamphus trochilirostris trochilirostris (red-billed scythebill)  - ICMBio status 
 Dendrexetastes rufigula paraensis (cinnamon-throated woodcreeper)  - ICMBio status 
 Dendrocincla taunayi (plain-winged woodcreeper)  - ICMBio status
 Dendrocincla merula badia (white-chinned woodcreeper)  - ICMBio status 
 Dendrocolaptes retentus (Xingu woodcreeper)  - ICMBio status 
 Dendrocolaptes medius (Amazonian barred woodcreeper)  - ICMBio status 
 Dendrocolaptes picumnus transfasciatus (black-banded woodcreeper)  - ICMBio status 
 Hylexetastes brigidai (Brigida's woodcreeper)  - ICMBio status 
 Lepidocolaptes wagleri (Wagler's woodcreeper)  - ICMBio status 
 Xiphocolaptes carajaensis (Carajás woodcreeper)  - ICMBio status 
 Xiphocolaptes falcirostris (moustached woodcreeper)  - ICMBio status 
 Xiphorhynchus atlanticus (lesser woodcreeper)  - Estado ICMBio 

Família Xenopidae (ovenbirds)
 Xenops minutus alagoanus (plain xenops)  - ICMBio status 
 Xiphorhynchus guttatus gracilirostris (buff-throated woodcreeper)  - ICMBio status 

Family Furnariidae (Neotropical ovenbirds)
 Acrobatornis fonsecai (pink-legged graveteiro)  - ICMBio status 
 Asthenes hudsoni (Hudson's canastero)  - ICMBio status 
 Automolus lammi (Pernambuco foliage-gleaner)  - ICMBio status 
 Cichlocolaptes mazarbarnetti (cryptic treehunter)  - ICMBio status 
 Coryphistera alaudina (lark-like brushrunner)  - ICMBio status 
 Cranioleuca muelleri (scaled spinetail)  - ICMBio status 
 Cinclodes espinhacensis (long-tailed cinclodes)  - ICMBio status 
 Leptasthenura platensis (tufted tit-spinetail)  - ICMBio status 
 Philydor novaesi (Alagoas foliage-gleaner)  - ICMBio status 
 Pseudoseisura lophotes (brown cacholote)  - ICMBio status 
 Synallaxis infuscata (Pinto's spinetail)  - ICMBio status 
 Synallaxis kollari (hoary-throated spinetail)  - ICMBio status 
 Thripophaga macroura (striated softtail)  - ICMBio status 

Family Pipridae (manakins)
 Antilophia bokermanni (Araripe manakin)  - ICMBio status 
 Lepidothrix vilasboasi (golden-crowned manakin)  - ICMBio status 
 Lepidothrix iris (opal-crowned manakin)  - ICMBio status 
 Lepidothrix iris iris (cabeça-de-prata)  - ICMBio status 
 Neopelma aurifrons (Wied's tyrant-manakin)  - ICMBio status 

Family Tityridae (tityras, mourners and allies)
 Iodopleura pipra (buff-throated purpletuft)  - ICMBio status 
 Iodopleura pipra leucopygia (buff-throated purpletuft)  - ICMBio status 
 Iodopleura pipra pipra (buff-throated purpletuft)  - ICMBio status 
 Schiffornis turdina intermedia (brown-winged schiffornis)  - ICMBio status 

Family Cotingidae (cotingas and bellbirds)
 Carpornis melanocephala (black-headed berryeater)  - ICMBio status 
 Cotinga maculata (banded cotinga)  - ICMBio status 
 Procnias albus wallacei (white bellbird)  - ICMBio status 
 Tijuca condita (grey-winged cotinga)  - ICMBio status 
 Xipholena atropurpurea (white-winged cotinga)  - ICMBio status 

Family Pipritidae (piprites)
 piprites chloris grisescens (wing-barred piprites)  - ICMBio status 

Family Platyrinchidae (calyptura)
 Calyptura cristata (kinglet calyptura)  - ICMBio status (PEx)

Family Rhynchocyclidae (tody-tyrants or bamboo tyrants)
 Hemitriccus furcatus (fork-tailed tody-tyrant)  - ICMBio status 
 Hemitriccus griseipectus naumburgae (white-bellied tody-tyrant)  - ICMBio status 
 Hemitriccus kaempferi (Kaempfer's tody-tyrant)  - ICMBio status 
 Hemitriccus mirandae (buff-breasted tody-tyrant)  - ICMBio status 
 Phylloscartes beckeri (Bahia tyrannulet)  - ICMBio status 
 Phylloscartes ceciliae (Alagoas tyrannulet)  - ICMBio status 

Family Tyrannidae (tyrant flycatchers)
 Alectrurus tricolor (cock-tailed tyrant)  - ICMBio status 
 Attila spadiceus uropygiatus (Bright-rumped attila)  - ICMBio status 
 Elaenia ridleyana (Noronha elaenia)  - ICMBio status 
 Platyrinchus mystaceus niveigularis (white-throated spadebill)  - ICMBio status 
 Serpophaga hypoleuca pallida (river tyrannulet)  - ICMBio status 
 Stigmatura napensis napensis (lesser wagtail-tyrant)  - ICMBio status 
 Xolmis dominicanus (black-and-white monjita)  - ICMBio status 

Family Vireonidae (vireos)
 Hylophilus ochraceiceps rubrifrons (tawny-crowned greenlet)  - ICMBio status 
 Vireo gracilirostris (Noronha vireo)  - ICMBio status 

Family Corvidae (crows and jays)
 Cyanocorax hafferi (Campina jay)  - ICMBio status 

Family Turidade (thrushes)
 Cichlopsis leucogenys (rufous-brown solitaire)  - ICMBio status 

Family Motacillidae (pipits)
 Anthus nattereri (ochre-breasted pipit)  - ICMBio status 

Family Passerellidae (New World sparrows)
 Arremonops conirostris (black-striped sparrow)  - ICMBio status 

Family Icteridae (New World blackbirds)
 Curaeus forbesi (Forbes's blackbird)  - ICMBio status 
 Sturnella defilippii (Pampas meadowlark)  - ICMBio status 
 Xanthopsar flavus (saffron-cowled blackbird)  - ICMBio status 

Family Thraupidae (tanagers)
 Conothraupis mesoleuca (cone-billed tanager)  - ICMBio status 
 Coryphaspiza melanotis (black-masked finch)  - ICMBio status 
 Gubernatrix cristata (yellow cardinal)  - ICMBio status 
 Nemosia rourei (cherry-throated tanager)  - ICMBio status 
 Sporophila beltoni (Tropeiro seedeater)  - ICMBio status 
 Sporophila falcirostris (Temminck's seedeater)  - ICMBio status 
 Sporophila frontalis (buffy-fronted seedeater)  - ICMBio status 
 Sporophila hypoxantha (tawny-bellied seedeater)  - ICMBio status 
 Sporophila maximiliani (great-billed seed finch)  - ICMBio status 
 Sporophila melanogaster (black-bellied seedeater)  - ICMBio status 
 Sporophila nigrorufa (black-and-tawny seedeater)  - ICMBio status 
 Sporophila palustris (marsh seedeater)  - ICMBio status 
 Sporophila ruficollis (dark-throated seedeater)  - ICMBio status 
 Tangara peruviana (black-backed tanager)  - ICMBio status 
 Tangara cyanocephala cearensis (red-necked tanager)  - ICMBio status 
 Tangara fastuosa (seven-colored tanager)  - ICMBio status 
 Tangara velia signata (opal-rumped tanager)  - ICMBio status 

Family Cardinalidae (cardinals)
 Caryothraustes canadensis frontalis (yellow-green grosbeak)  - ICMBio status 

Family Fringillidae (siskins)
 Sporagra yarrellii (yellow-faced siskin)  - ICMBio status

See also
List of birds of Brazil

References

.
Birds, threatened
Brazil
.
Nature conservation in Brazil
Birds,Brazil
Brazil